The Federal Open Market Committee (FOMC) is a committee within the Federal Reserve System (the Fed) that is charged under United States law with overseeing the nation's open market operations (e.g., the Fed's buying and selling of United States Treasury securities). This Federal Reserve committee makes key decisions about interest rates and the growth of the United States money supply. Under the terms of the original Federal Reserve Act, each of the Federal Reserve banks was authorized to buy and sell in the open market bonds and short term obligations of the United States Government, bank acceptances, cable transfers, and bills of exchange. Hence, the reserve banks were at times bidding against each other in the open market. In 1922, an informal committee was established to execute purchases and sales. The Banking Act of 1933 formed an official FOMC.

The FOMC is the principal organ of United States national monetary policy. The Committee sets monetary policy by specifying the short-term objective for the Fed's open market operations, which is usually a target level for the federal funds rate (the rate that commercial banks charge between themselves for overnight loans).

The FOMC also directs operations undertaken by the Federal Reserve System in foreign exchange markets, although any intervention in foreign exchange markets is coordinated with the U.S. Treasury, which has responsibility for formulating U.S. policies regarding the exchange value of the dollar.

Membership 
The Committee consists of the seven members of the Federal Reserve Board, the president of the New York Fed, and four of the other eleven regional Federal Reserve Bank presidents, serving one year terms. The Chair of the Federal Reserve has been invariably appointed by the committee as its chair since 1935, solidifying the perception of the two roles as one.

The Federal Open Market Committee was formed by the Banking Act of 1933 (codified at ), and did not include voting rights for the Federal Reserve Board of Governors. The Banking Act of 1935 revised these protocols to include the Board of Governors and to closely resemble the present-day FOMC, and was amended in 1942 to give the current structure of twelve voting members.

Four of the Federal Reserve Bank presidents serve one-year terms on a rotating basis. The rotating seats are filled from the following four groups of banks, one bank president from each group: Boston, Philadelphia, and Richmond; Cleveland and Chicago; Atlanta, St. Louis, and Dallas; and Minneapolis, Kansas City, and San Francisco. The New York President always has a voting membership.

All of the Reserve Bank presidents, even those who are not currently voting members of the FOMC, attend Committee meetings, participate in discussions, and contribute to the Committee's assessment of the economy and policy options. The Committee meets eight times a year, approximately once every six weeks.

Meetings 

By law, the FOMC must meet at least four times each year in Washington, D.C. Since 1981, eight regularly scheduled meetings have been held each year at intervals of five to eight weeks. If circumstances require consultation or consideration of an action between these regular meetings, members may be called on to participate in a special meeting or a telephone conference, or to vote on a proposed action by proxy. At each regularly scheduled meeting, the Committee votes on the policy to be carried out during the interval between meetings.

Attendance at meetings is restricted because of the confidential nature of the information discussed and is limited to Committee members, nonmember Reserve Bank presidents, staff officers, the Manager of the System Open Market Account, and a small number of Board and Reserve Bank staff.

Decision-making process 
Before each regularly scheduled meeting of the FOMC, System staff prepare written reports on past and prospective economic and financial developments that are sent to Committee members and to nonmember Reserve Bank presidents. Reports prepared by the Manager of the System Open Market Account on operations in the domestic open market and in foreign currencies since the last regular meeting are also distributed. At the meeting itself, staff officers present oral reports on the current and prospective business situation, on conditions in financial markets, and on international financial developments.

In its discussions, the Committee considers factors such as trends in prices and wages, employment and production, consumer income and spending, residential and commercial construction, business investment and inventories, foreign exchange markets, interest rates, money and credit aggregates, and fiscal policy. The Manager of the System Open Market Account also reports on account transactions since the previous meeting.

After these reports, the Committee members and other Reserve Bank presidents turn to policy. Typically, each participant expresses their own views on the state of the economy and prospects for the future and on the appropriate direction for monetary policy. Then each makes a more explicit recommendation on policy for the coming intermeeting period (and for the longer run, if under consideration).

Consensus 
Finally, the Committee must reach a consensus regarding the appropriate course for policy, which is incorporated in a directive to the Federal Reserve Bank of New York—the Bank that executes transactions for the System Open Market Account. The directive is cast in terms designed to provide guidance to the Manager in the conduct of day-to-day open market operations. The directive sets forth the Committee's objectives for long-run growth of certain key monetary and credit aggregates.

It also sets forth operating guidelines for the degree of ease or restraint to be sought in reserve conditions and expectations with regard to short-term rates of growth in the monetary aggregates. Policy is implemented with emphasis on supplying reserves in a manner consistent with these objectives and with the nation's broader economic objectives.

Congressional oversight
Under the Federal Reserve Act, the Chairman of the Board of Governors of the Federal Reserve System must appear before Congressional hearings at least twice per year regarding "the efforts, activities, objectives and plans of the Board and the Federal Open Market Committee with respect to the conduct of monetary policy". The statute requires that the Chairman appear before the House Committee on Financial Services in February and July of odd-numbered years, and before the Senate Committee on Banking, Housing, and Urban Affairs in February and July of even-numbered years.

There is a very strong consensus against basing selection of committee members primarily on the candidate's political views.

Interest rate targeting
The committee's practice of interest rate targeting has been criticized by some commentators who argue that it may risk an inflationary bias.

Possible alternative rules that enjoy some support among economists include the traditional monetarist formula of targeting stable growth in an appropriately chosen monetary aggregate, and inflation targeting, now practiced by many central banks. Under inflationary pressure in 1979, the Fed temporarily abandoned interest rate targeting in favor of targeting non-borrowed reserves.  It concluded, however, that this approach led to increased volatility in interest rates and monetary growth, and reversed itself in 1982.

Former Fed Chairman Ben Bernanke spoke sympathetically as a Governor in 2003 of the inflation targeting approach.  He explained that even a central bank like the Fed, which does not orient its monetary policies around an explicit, published inflation target, nonetheless takes account of its goal of low and stable inflation in formulating its interest rate targets.  Bernanke summed up his overall assessment of inflation targeting as follows:

In keeping with his 2003 speech as Governor, Bernanke as Chairman has attempted to promote greater transparency in Fed communications. The Fed now publicly indicates the range within which it would like to see future inflation.

Current members
Members of the FOMC :

Members
Jerome Powell, Board of Governors, Chairman
John C. Williams, New York, Vice Chairman
Michael S. Barr, Board of Governors (NB: Mr. Barr is Vice Chair of the Federal Reserve for Supervision)
Michelle Bowman, Board of Governors (NB: Ms. Bowman occupies the Community Bank seat on the Board)
Lisa D. Cook, Board of Governors
Philip N. Jefferson, Board of Governors
Christopher Waller, Board of Governors
Austan Goolsbee, Chicago
Patrick T. Harker, Philadelphia
Lorie K. Logan, Dallas
Neel Kashkari, Minneapolis

Alternate members
Loretta J. Mester, Cleveland
Thomas Barkin, Richmond
Raphael Bostic, Atlanta
Mary C. Daly, San Francisco
Sushmita Shukla, First Vice President, New York

Federal Reserve Bank Rotation on the FOMC
Committee membership changes at the first regularly scheduled meeting of the year. In the case of 2023, this was on January 24, 2023.

2023 Members - New York, Chicago, Philadelphia, Dallas, Minneapolis

2023 Alternate Members - New York, Cleveland, Richmond, Atlanta, San Francisco

For the Federal Reserve Bank of New York, the First Vice President is the alternate for the President.

See also

Federal funds rate
Monetary Policy Committee, the equivalent organ of the United Kingdom's Bank of England, and modeled in part on the FOMC

Further reading

 Lunsford, Kurt G. 2020. "Policy Language and Information Effects in the Early Days of Federal Reserve Forward Guidance." American Economic Review, 110 (9): 2899-2934.
 Fligstein, Neil; Stuart Brundage, Jonah; Schultz, Michael (2017). "Seeing Like the Fed: Culture, Cognition, and Framing in the Failure to Anticipate the Financial Crisis of 2008". American Sociological Review 82 (5): 879–909.

References

External links

Federal Open Market Committee: official site
Federal Reserve Bank of Philadelphia: A Day in the Life of the FOMC
University of Rochester: Shadow Open Market Committee 
Federal Reserve Board: Come with Me to the FOMC
What happens to the markets on "Fed Days" Fed Day Charts
Minutes of FOMC meetings
FOMC Speak, a repository of FOMC participant speeches, testimony, interviews and commentary
Historical documents relating to the FOMC, as well as the Open Market Investment Committee and Open Market Policy Conference, predecessors of the FOMC
 Public Law 305, 74th Congress, H.R. 7617: An Act to Provide for the Sound, Effective, and Uninterrupted Operation of the Banking System [Banking Act of 1935]
 Public Law 66, 73d Congress, H.R. 5661: an Act to Provide for the Safer and More Effective Use of the Assets of Banks, to Regulate Interbank Control, to Prevent the Undue Diversion of Funds into Speculative Operations [Banking Act of 1933]

Federal Reserve System
1933 establishments in the United States
Committees

de:Federal Reserve System#Gremien des Federal Reserve System